Wiesenthal or Wiesental may mean:

Places
 Wiesenthal, a municipality in Thuringia, Germany
 Oberwiesenthal, a town and ski resort in Erzgebirgs District, Saxony, Germany, known as Wiesenthal
 Wiesenthal an der Neiße, an old name of Lučany nad Nisou in the Czech Republic
 Wiesenthal, Bohemia, an old name for Loučná pod Klínovcem in the Czech Republic
 Wiesenthal, Brandenburg, an old name for Chlebice in Poland
 Wiesenthal, East Prussia, an old name for Bachorza, Warmian-Masurian Voivodeship in Poland
 Wiesenthal, Pomerania, an old name for Święcianowo in Poland
 Wiesenthal, Posnan, an old name for Skoraczewo, Greater Poland Voivodeship

Silesia

 Wiesenthal, Frankenstein, Silesia, an old name for Wadochowice in Silesia, Poland
 Wiesenthal, Löwenberg, Silesia, an old name for Bystrzyca, Lwówek Śląski County, in Silesia, Poland
 Wiesenthal, Militsch, Silesia, an old name for Ostrowąsy, Lower Silesian Voivodeship, Poland

Wiesental
 Wiesental, Austria, a valley in Mistelbach District, Lower Austria 
 Wiesental, Germany, the valley of the Wiese river in the Black Forest and Baden-Württemberg
 Wiesental, Black Forest, Valley of the river Wiese, in the Southern Black Forest
 Wiesental (Baden)
 Wiesenttal, a municipality in Forchheim District, Bavaria, Germany
 Wisental, Switzerland, a valley in Hombrechtikon, Meilen District, Zurich Canton, Switzerland

Outer space
 69275 Wiesenthal (1989 WD4), an asteroid

Family name 

 Grete Wiesenthal (1885–1970), an Austrian dancer and choreographer
 Simon Wiesenthal (1908–2005), a Jewish Galician-Austrian who became a Nazi hunter after surviving the Holocaust
 Kreisky-Peter-Wiesenthal affair
 Simon Wiesenthal Center
 Helmut Wiesenthal (born 1938, Meuselwitz), a German sociologist, politologist (de)
 Charles Fredrick Wiesenthal (?), one of the inventors of the sewing machine
 Mauricio Wiesenthal (born 1943), Spanish writer from, Barcelona
 Robert S. Wiesenthal (born 1966), an American businessman